The Loyalton Fire was a wildfire burning in Lassen, Plumas and Sierra County, California, and Washoe County, Nevada.

Events

The fire was started by lightning strikes northeast of Loyalton along the eastern edge of the Sierra Valley, near Mount Ina Coolbrith on the Tahoe National Forest. Smoke was first reported from the Smith Peak lookout in Plumas National Forest at 4:30 pm on Friday, August 14. The fire was burning in a mix of timber, sagebrush and tall grass. Around 2:35 PM PDT, high winds and thunderstorm activity spawned a two "fire tornadoes", one of which was rated EF1. The National Weather Service issued its first-ever fire tornado warning, for southeastern Lassen County, in response to the incident. An EF1 fire tornado had also been spawned by the fire the previous day.

Evacuation orders were issued for areas in Lassen County south of SR 70 and west of US 395. SR 70 was closed between SR 49 and US 395 as fire crews worked to prevent the fire from spreading north of Beckwourth Pass. The fire briefly jumped north of SR 70 and east of US 395 but was quickly stopped in those directions. By the evening of August 16, helped by strong winds, the fire had burned . Evacuation orders were expanded to Balls Canyon Road, Long Valley Road, Bordertown, Copperfield, and Cold Springs as the fire spread east into Nevada and the Humboldt-Toiyabe National Forest. About 580 firefighters, 42 engines and 6 aircraft were on the scene. 

Crews had made progress on the southeast flank of the fire on August 17, mandatory evacuations were lifted for Cold Springs, and SR 70 was reopened. The Dog Valley and Long Valley areas of the Carson Ranger District on the Humboldt-Toiyabe National Forest were closed to recreational access. By evening, advisory evacuation orders were in place for Loyalton, Chilcoot, Vinton, and Sierra Brooks. Lightning strikes started several new fires to the south around 7:30 pm, but rain after midnight helped slow fire activity. As of August 17, five homes and six other structures had been destroyed.

On August 18, the fire had been largely contained on the north and east, and mandatory evacuations were lifted in Lassen County. However, it continued spreading rapidly to the south and west, largely due to the lightning strikes there the previous day.

High winds continued throughout August 19, but crews had managed to slow the fire spread considerably. Evacuation advisories were lifted for Cold Springs and Bordertown. By the evening, evacuation advisories were also lifted for Chilcoot, Vinton and Loyalton, although evacuation orders remained in place for Balls Canyon Road, Long Valley Road, and Copperfield, and evacuation advisory for Sierra Brooks.

On the morning of August 20, evacuation advisories were lifted for Sierra Brooks and Copperfield. As of 5:44 pm on August 20, the fire had burned  and was 60 percent contained. Air quality continued to be extremely poor in Sierra Valley and Reno, with visibility highly impaired by smoke.

On the morning of August 21, evacuation orders remained in place for Balls Canyon Road and Long Valley Road. The fire had burned  and remained at 60 percent containment.

Wind activity decreased significantly over the weekend helping fire crews to expand containment. A total of six homes and 29 other structures were reported destroyed. All evacuation orders were lifted as of this time, though the Dog Valley area of the Humboldt-Toiyabe National Forest remained closed.

On September 14, the fire became 100% contained. It burned  and destroyed at least 35 structures.

References

2020 California wildfires
Wildfires in Lassen County, California
Wildfires in Plumas County, California
Wildfires in Sierra County, California